Andrew John Biemiller (July 23, 1906 – April 3, 1982) was an American politician and labor union officer.

Background 
Biemiller was born July 23, 1906, in Sandusky, Ohio, and was educated in the public schools there. He got a B. A. degree from Cornell University in 1926, was an instructor in history at Syracuse University from 1926 to 1928, and then studied in the graduate school of the University of Pennsylvania from 1929 to 1931, teaching undergraduate classes, as well as teaching at Bryn Mawr Summer School for Workers (1930–31).

After graduating, Biemiller became active in the Socialist Party of America and was a campaign manager for Norman Thomas, Socialist candidate for president in 1932. In 1933, he went to Milwaukee to work for the party, serving as educational director of the party from 1933 to 1936, editing the Milwaukee Leader (a Socialist newspaper) from 1934 to 1936, and working with various organizations.

He became an active member of the Farmer-Labor Progressive Federation as well as the Socialist Party. Biemiller was a member of the American Federation of Teachers, and the American Newspaper Guild, served on the executive board of the Milwaukee Federated Trades Council and was vice-president of the Wisconsin Turner District.

Public office

Assembly 
In 1936 he was elected to the Wisconsin State Assembly on the ticket of the Wisconsin Progressive Party (the Socialists and Progressives were practicing a form of electoral fusion during this period; but his biography clearly identified him as an active Socialist) from the 2nd Milwaukee County district (the 2nd and 10th Wards of the City of Milwaukee), unseating Democratic incumbent Clarence Kretlow, with 6,767 votes to 5867 for Kretlow and 2129 for Republican Alex Klose. He was appointed to the standing committees on the judiciary and public welfare, to a special joint committee on "Legislation on Administration of State Government", and perhaps most importantly to the "Interim Committee" appointed in 1937 by the Legislature to discuss reorganization of Wisconsin government.

He was re-elected in 1938, with 5,098 votes to 2934 for Republican Edward J. Mueller and 2848 for Democrat William W. Murphy. He remained on the judiciary committee, and was appointed to special committees on "Revenue Needs of the State for the Current Biennium" and automobile title laws.

He was re-elected once more in 1940, with 7,812 votes to 4,869 for former Socialist State Representative Otto Kehrein (now running as a Republican) and 4095 for Democrat Elmer Foerster. He was moved to the committee on engrossed bills and to an additional special committee on "Subversive and Un-American Activities of Certain Groups of Employes Engaged in the Manufacture of National Defense Materials". His official biography no longer listed him as an active member of the Socialist Party, but did describe him as a member of the Progressive Party Federation; and he became the floor leader of the Progressive Party in the Assembly.

Biemiller continued to work as a special organizer for the Wisconsin State Federation of Labor through 1942, when he moved to Washington to take a position in the War Production Board. He did not run for re-election, and was succeeded in the Assembly by Democrat Michael F. O'Connell.

Congress 
In 1944 he was elected as a Democrat  (Biemiller had abandoned both the Socialist Party and the Progressives by then) to the 79th Congress from the Milwaukee-based Wisconsin's 5th congressional district, unseating Republican incumbent Lewis D. Thill, with 88,606 votes to Thill's 78,834, Socialist former State Representative Edwin Knappe's 4,758, and 2,103 for Independent Progressive Irwin Aaron.

He was defeated for re-election in 1946 by Republican Charles J. Kersten, and went to work as director of political education for the Upholsterers Union. During this period Biemiller joined many other former Socialists and Progressives in helping to found Americans for Democratic Action. He cooperated with Hubert Humphrey in successfully calling for a strong civil rights plank at the 1948 Democratic National Convention, to which he was a delegate and chair of the platform committee which produced the plank.

He defeated Kersten in a 1948 re-match for election to the 81st Congress, but once more lost a bid for re-election in 1950 to Kersten.

After Congress 
After losing his seat in Congress, Biemiller worked through the remainder of the Truman administration at the Department of the Interior. He served from 1953 to 1956 as a legislative representative (lobbyist) for the American Federation of Labor, and then Director of the Department of Legislation (chief lobbyist) of the AFL-CIO from 1956 to 1978.  During this period, he played a significant role in passing civil rights, Medicare, and other social and economic legislation, especially during the Kennedy and Johnson administrations.

Legacy 
As a legislator, congressman and labor activist and advocate, Biemiller had played a role in most major social legislation of his era. He died in Bethesda, Maryland, on April 3, 1982. His papers are at the Carl Albert Center at the University of Oklahoma.

References

External links
Andrew J. Biemiller Collection at the Carl Albert Center
[transcript] Fuchs, James R. "Oral History Interview with Andrew J. Biemiller" Washington, D.C.: July 29, 1977

1906 births
1982 deaths
AFL–CIO people
Cornell University alumni
Politicians from Milwaukee
Politicians from Sandusky, Ohio
Wisconsin Progressives (1924)
Socialist Party of America politicians from Wisconsin
Democratic Party members of the United States House of Representatives from Wisconsin
20th-century American politicians
Wisconsin State Federation of Labor people
Democratic Party members of the Wisconsin State Assembly